The Bayer designations e Carinae and E Carinae are distinct and the designation e Carinae is shared by two stars in the constellation Carina:
for e1 Carinae, see HD 73390
for e2 Carinae, see HD 73389
for E Carinae, see V345 Carinae

See also
ε Carinae

Carinae, e
Carina (constellation)